The Voice Kids is a British television music competition to find new singing talent. The sixth series began airing on 26 December 2022, on ITV. Emma Willis returned to present the series. Danny Jones, Pixie Lott and will.i.am returned as coaches, whilst, on 21 January 2022, it was announced that former The Voice Australia coach   Ronan Keating would replace Melanie C this series.Similar to the previous series, it was announced that the series would contain three episodes – two blind auditions and the final – which aired over three consecutive nights, with the show concluding on 28 December.

Israella Chris won the competition, marking Pixie Lott's fourth win as a coach and the most wins in any version of the UK variation of the show after Sir Tom Jones gained his third victory in eleventh regular series.

Teams
Colour key:
  Winner
  Finalist
  Eliminated in the Battles

Blind auditions

Episode 1 (26 December) 
The first episode aired on 26 December 2022 and featured the first round of auditions.

Episode 2 (27 December)
The second episode aired on 27 December 2022 and featured the second round of auditions.

Show details

Results summary
Team's colour key
 Team Will
 Team Ronan
 Team Pixie
 Team Danny

Result's colour key
 Artist received the most public votes
 Finalist
 Artist was eliminated

Final (28 December)
The final episode aired on 28 December 2022.

Battles round

Grand Final

References

Voice Kids (British series 6)
2022 British television seasons